Aristida longespica is a species of grass known by the common name slimspike threeawn. Aristida longespica var. geniculata is listed as a species of special concern in the State of Connecticut.

Gallery

References

longespica
Flora of North America